The Kwun Tong line is a heavy-rail rapid transit line of the MTR network in Hong Kong, coloured green on the MTR map. Starting at Whampoa in Hung Hom and ending at Tiu Keng Leng in Tseung Kwan O, Sai Kung, the route has 17 stations and takes 35 minutes to complete. The Kwun Tong line is one of the busiest railway lines on the network connecting the central and the eastern portions of Kowloon via Wong Tai Sin. The line is mostly underground, but includes a lengthy elevated section, and runs generally in an east-west direction. During the morning rush hour, the Kwun Tong line utilises 33 trains running at 2.1-minute-intervals to achieve a route capacity of 85,000 pphpd.

Opened on 1 October 1979 as the first urban railway line in Hong Kong and the first operated by the Mass Transit Railway Corporation (MTRC), the Kwun Tong line operates over much of the original section of the "Modified Initial System", from Shek Kip Mei to Kwun Tong station, which it is named after. The line has seen the most changes in alignment of all the MTR lines, the most recent in 2016. It has crossed Victoria Harbour to serve Hong Kong Island using two separate routes in its history, though other lines have since taken over the harbour crossings; as such, the current route lies entirely within Kowloon except for Tiu Keng Leng in the New Territories. It has interchanges with four other lines: the Tsuen Wan line at Yau Ma Tei- Prince Edward station, the East Rail line at Kowloon Tong station, the Tuen Ma line at Ho Man Tin and Diamond Hill station, and the Tseung Kwan O line at Yau Tong and Tiu Keng Leng station.

Route map

History

Initial section 
The Kwun Tong line operates over the majority of the track used by the "Modified Initial System", and can so be said to be the first MTR line to enter service. It was predated only by the suburban East Rail line, which at the time was in the process of being electrified and upgraded to a commuter service as part of the Kowloon–Canton Railway. Construction was approved in November 1975 under the administration of Governor Murray MacLehose, and service commenced on 1 October 1979. The line initially ran between Shek Kip Mei station and Kwun Tong station, and each train consisted of four cars. The trains were expanded to consist of 6 cars and 8 cars later respectively. It was extended to the south twice: firstly to Tsim Sha Tsui on 31 December 1979, and secondly to Central station on 12 February 1980 (named Chater at the time), crossing Victoria Harbour through the first underwater rail tunnel in Hong Kong and completing the original Modified Initial System plan.

When the Tsuen Wan line started service in May 1982, it took over the section of the Modified Initial System south of Argyle (present-day Mong Kok). At that point, Waterloo (present-day Yau Ma Tei) station became the terminus of the newly christened Kwun Tong line (until then, the line had no official name), and both Argyle and Prince Edward stations became cross-platform interchange stations with the new line.

Eastern extension 
When the Hong Kong government decided to build a second harbour crossing in 1984, it awarded a franchise for the construction of a mixed rail and road tunnel under the harbour. Consequentially, the Kwun Tong line was extended through the new tunnel on 6 August 1989 to a new terminus at Quarry Bay, a transfer station with the newly built Island line. An intermediate station, Lam Tin, was opened on 1 October of the same year.

The first derailment in MTR history (excluding ex-KCR lines) took place at Kowloon Bay station in 1994. The seventh carriage of a train pulling into the station at about 60 km/h jumped the tracks on 28 January 1994, on a section of track adjacent to the MTR headquarters building. Nobody was injured, though train services were disrupted. The incident was blamed on a bolt in the train's suspension system which had worked itself loose, causing the weight load to be concentrated on the rear wheels of the carriage.

As part of a project to reduce congestion at Quarry Bay, the Kwun Tong line was briefly extended to North Point on 27 September 2001. This station did not last as the terminus for long, as the newly built Tseung Kwan O line would take over the cross-harbour portion of the route in 2002. The Kwun Tong line was instead diverted in two phases: to Yau Tong station on 4 August 2002 and on 18 August 2002 to Tiu Keng Leng, its present eastern terminus, coinciding with the opening of the Tseung Kwan O line.

Although not in regular service, the original tunnel linking the Kwun Tong line to the Eastern Harbour Crossing continues to be maintained and can be utilised in the event of a disruption on the Tseung Kwan O line. Such an incident occurred on 16 December 2013, when a train on the Tseung Kwan O line broke down, halting train services on the entire line for several hours. To prevent cross-harbour train service from being disrupted, all Kwun Tong line trains temporarily used the old tracks from Lam Tin to Quarry Bay and terminated at North Point, as they did before the opening of the Tseung Kwan O line. This was the first time since 2002 that the Lam Tin to Quarry Bay tracks were utilised for regular service.

Western extension 

As part of its bid for Sha Tin to Central Link (SCL) in the early 2000s, the MTR Corporation proposed an extension of the Kwun Tong line to serve the Whampoa Garden area, with an interchange at Ho Man Tin to an extended Ma On Shan line, which would provide an alternate route to the Tsuen Wan line across Victoria Harbour to Central South station. Its competitor, the Kowloon-Canton Railway Corporation, suggested constructing an Automated People Mover between Hung Hom and Whampoa instead.

After the MTR–KCR merger in 2007, the Hong Kong government appointed the MTRC to construct the SCL between Tai Wai and Hung Hom according to the KCRC's modified proposal, which would see the Ma On Shan and West Rail lines merged to form the Tuen Ma line, while also extending the Kwun Tong line to Whampoa as per the MTRC's own proposal. The benefits would be a better transfer arrangement at Ho Man Tin and other SCL interchange stations for services to the northeastern and northwestern New Territories. Passengers would be able to change to the North-South corridor at Hung Hom for cross-harbour services, which would terminate at Admiralty after Central South station was removed from the final plan.

The  Kwun Tong line extension (abbreviated KTE) from Yau Ma Tei to Whampoa via Ho Man Tin began construction on 25 July 2011 and opened for service on 23 October 2016. Because of capacity limitations due to the single platform at Whampoa, half of all Whampoa-bound trains terminate at Ho Man Tin during peak hours; all trains terminate at Whampoa during off-peak hours.

Further extension of the Kwun Tong line to Hong Kong Island was also proposed in RDS-2000 to constitute the fifth harbour crossing.

Rolling stock

Route description 
The Kwun Tong line is mostly underground and runs generally east-west. It begins at Whampoa station and heads northwest, with an interchange to the Tuen Ma line at Ho Man Tin. It curves to the southwest and then north to meet the Tsuen Wan line at Yau Ma Tei, with the Tsuen Wan line platforms above the Kwun Tong Line platforms. At this point, the line runs underneath Nathan Road alongside the Tsuen Wan line, with stations at Mong Kok and Prince Edward providing cross-platform interchanges.

The Kwun Tong line then splits from the Tsuen Wan line and turns to the east after Shek Kip Mei. At Kowloon Tong, there is an important, widely used interchange with the suburban East Rail line. Continuing eastwards through Wong Tai Sin, the line interchanges with the Tuen Ma line again at Diamond Hill, after which it turns south and emerges above ground after Choi Hung station. It then runs southeast on a viaduct above Kwun Tong Road between Kowloon Bay and Lam Tin stations.

After Lam Tin station, the line travels through a tunnel in a hill and emerges above ground level at Yau Tong (although the line is completely covered at this point), where it meets with the Tseung Kwan O line. Both the Kwun Tong and Tseung Kwan O lines pass beneath the Tseung Kwan O cemetery in tunnel before entering Tseung Kwan O in an northeasterly direction at Tiu Keng Leng, where the Kwun Tong line terminates. Yau Tong and Tiu Keng Leng stations provide cross-platform interchanges in the same manner as Mong Kok and Prince Edward. Expansions for the Kwun Tong line to expand east have been made undoable due to the building structure of Tseung Kwan O station, just mere meters ahead from the end of the Kwun Tong line tunnels.

Stations
This is a list of the stations on the Kwun Tong line.

List

Notes

See also 
 East Rail line
 Tseung Kwan O line
 Tsuen Wan line

References

External links 

Proposed extension to Ho Man Tin and Whampoa Garden (Adobe Systems Acrobat pdf format)

 
MTR lines
Railway lines opened in 1979
1432 mm gauge railways in Hong Kong
1500 V DC railway electrification